The Women's 63 kg weightlifting competitions at the 2016 Summer Olympics in Rio de Janeiro took place on 9 August at the Pavilion 2 of Riocentro.

Schedule
All times are Time in Brazil (UTC-03:00)

Records
Prior to this competition, the existing world and Olympic records were as follows.

Results

New records

References 

Weightlifting at the 2016 Summer Olympics
Olymp
Women's events at the 2016 Summer Olympics